The Field hockey event at the 2010 Asian Games was held in Guangzhou, Guangdong, China from 13 November 2010 for Women and 15 November 2010 for Men. In this tournament, 10 teams played in the men's competition, and 7 teams participated in the women's competition. All matches were played at the Aoti Hockey Field.

Medalists

Medal table

Qualification
Top 6 Asian teams, South Korea, India, Pakistan, Japan, China and Malaysia could enter the men's competition directly. For the next two spots a qualification tournament was held in Dhaka, Bangladesh from 7 to 16 May 2010. Oman and Singapore qualified as top two teams, Hong Kong and Bangladesh were added later.

Women's qualification tournament was held in Bangkok, Thailand from 21 to 29 May 2010. Three teams qualified for the Asian Games but later Chinese Taipei withdrew.

Men

Women

Draw
The teams were distributed according to their position at the FIH World Rankings using the serpentine system for their distribution.

Group A
 (6)
 (14)
 (15)
 (39)
 (43)

Group B
 (8)
 (9)
 (16)
 (34)
 (54)

Final standing

Men

Women

References

Men Results
Women Results

External links
Hockey at the 2010 Asian Games (Guangzhou)

 
2010
2010 Asian Games events
Asian Games
2010